The 2022 Japanese Grand Prix (officially known as the Formula 1 Honda Japanese Grand Prix 2022) was a Formula One motor race held on 9 October 2022 at the Suzuka International Racing Course in Suzuka, Japan. Max Verstappen secured his second World Championship title after finishing first, in front of Sergio Pérez and Charles Leclerc. Despite only 28 of the scheduled 53 laps being completed full points were awarded due to a loophole in the regulations regarding how points should be allocated with the rules stating that reduced points should only be awarded in shortened races that end under red flag conditions. As this race ended under green flag conditions this system was not applied. The wording of the sporting regulations was subsequently ammended for 2023 so that races that reach less than 75 percent distance applies the shortened race points criteria is irrespective of whether a race finishes under red or green flag conditions in future.

Background
The event was held across the weekend of the 7–9 October. Valtteri Bottas entered as the defending race winner.

Championship standings before the race
Going into the weekend, Max Verstappen led the Drivers' Championship by 104 points from Charles Leclerc, second, and teammate Sergio Pérez, third, by 106. Red Bull Racing team led the Constructors' Championship, leading Ferrari by 137 points and Mercedes by 203 points. For the second race running, Verstappen had an opportunity to secure his second World Drivers' Championship in a row. He needed to outscore Leclerc by eight points and Pérez by six. Verstappen could have won the title as follows:

Entrants

The drivers and teams were the same as the season entry list with no additional stand-in drivers for the race.

Tyre choices

Tyre supplier Pirelli brought the C1, C2, and C3 tyre compounds (designated hard, medium, and soft, respectively) for teams to use at the event.

Track changes 
The DRS detection point was moved further back, being positioned  after turn 15.

Penalties 
Williams' Nicholas Latifi carried a five-place grid penalty for causing a collision with Zhou Guanyu at the previous round, the Singapore Grand Prix.

Qualifying 
After qualifying, Max Verstappen was given a reprimand by stewards for an incident in Q3 involving loss of control of the car requiring Lando Norris to manoeuvre around Verstappen at speed coming out of 130R. There was no grid penalty issued.

Qualifying classification 

Notes
  – Pierre Gasly qualified 17th, but he was required to start the race from the pit lane due to modifications to a rear wing assembly, front wing ballast and the setup of the suspension.
  – Nicholas Latifi received a five-place grid penalty for causing a collision with Zhou Guanyu at the previous round. He gained a position as Gasly was required to start the race from the pit lane.

Race

Race report 
Before the race started, voice actress, singer and narrator Nana Mizuki sang the Japanese national anthem. The race started at 14:00 local time on 9 October 2022 under torrential rain (which was the reason for so many incidents in the race) and was red-flagged on lap 2 after Ferrari driver Carlos Sainz Jr. lost control into the hairpin of the opening lap and aquaplaned into the barriers. A recovery vehicle was immediately dispatched, with several drivers passing the tractor at speed under double-yellow flags on the second lap. Alex Albon also retired due a collision with Kevin Magnussen which caused damage to his radiator.

The race resumed at 16:15 local time behind the safety car. Only twenty-eight laps were completed before the race was curtailed due it passing the three-hour time limit, with Verstappen taking his twelfth victory of the season. Leclerc, who finished second on track, was given a five-second penalty for cutting the final chicane whist defending from Pérez in third, which demoted him to third behind Pérez. The win meant that Verstappen took the Championship title, leading Pérez by 113 points, with 112 points still available.

Post-race 
As less than 75% of the scheduled race distance had been completed, the majority of the paddock were under the impression that Verstappen would not be awarded full points, Verstappen instead earning 19 points and Leclerc 12, which would have left Verstappen one point short of claiming the championship. Verstappen himself expressed surprise in the cooldown room that full points had been awarded, making him champion.

The confusion regarding the number of points awarded was as a result of a rule change introduced for the 2022 season. Although historically races curtailed on such a scale as this Grand Prix would see half-points awarded, the wording of the new regulation only applied "If a race is suspended and cannot be resumed"; as the race was resumed and completed short, the FIA awarded full points under a strict reading of the regulations, effectively bypassing the gradual scale points system that had been introduced for 2022, following dissatisfaction with how points were allocated at the 2021 Belgian Grand Prix. Red Bull Racing team principal Christian Horner expressed his view that the rule would be revised for the  season to closer match the teams' intentions when the rule was written. Prior to the 2023 championship the F1 Commission agreed to alter the wording of the regulations to ensure all races where less than 75% of the race distance is completed now use the sliding scale system to determine the points being given, regardless of whether they finish under red or green flag conditions. This wording change satisfies the original intention of the gradual scale points system when it was introduced in 2022.

The deployment and position of the recovery vehicle on the track was criticised after AlphaTauri driver Pierre Gasly narrowly missed the vehicle due to poor visibility, angrily remonstrated that "[he] could have killed [himself]" if he had lost control and hit the vehicle, even at reduced speed. Gasly also attacked the deployment as "disrespectful" to the memory and family of his childhood friend Jules Bianchi, who suffered fatal injuries at the 2014 Japanese Grand Prix when he crashed into a recovery vehicle after aquaplaning off the circuit. Bianchi's godson Charles Leclerc also said that the sport should learn from Bianchi's death and not have similar issues in the future, and Bianchi's father wrote on Instagram that the race officials had "no respect" for either the life of the drivers or Bianchi's memory. The FIA confirmed there would be an investigation into the deployment of recovery vehicles.

Race classification 

Notes
  – The race distance was initially scheduled to be completed for 53 laps before being shortened due to a red flag.
  – Charles Leclerc finished second, but he received a five-second time penalty for leaving the track and gaining an advantage.
  – Pierre Gasly finished 17th, but he received a drive-through penalty (converted to a 20-second time penalty post-race) for speeding under red flag conditions.

FIA investigation 
On 21 October 2022, the FIA published its review into the Grand Prix with the FIA's report recognising that the deployment of the recovery could have been handled better.

The FIA is due to implement a warning system of recovery vehicles on track. The FIA stated that the VSC system would be improved so that the drivers speed limit could vary depending on where the car is in relation to the site of any on-track incident. In addition the FIA said it would look into further improvements to the full wet weather tyres and to circuit's drainage capabilities. The FIA stated the intention to review how points were awarded at the next World Motorsport Council meeting.

The FIA abandoned the idea of rotating race directors, leaving Niels Wittich as the sole serving race director for the final four rounds of the championship. The rotation policy was not met with favourable reviews from drivers, as well as being in response to criticism of Eduardo Freitas' performance as race director at this event.

Championship standings after the race

Drivers' Championship standings

Constructors' Championship standings

 Note: Only the top five positions are included for both sets of standings.
 Bold text indicates competitors who still had a theoretical chance of becoming World Champion.

See also
 2014 Japanese Grand Prix, which saw Jules Bianchi fatally crash into a recovery vehicle

References

External links

Japanese
2022
Grand Prix
Japanese Grand Prix
Formula One controversies